Roque Santeiro is a Brazilian primetime telenovela produced and broadcast by TV Globo. It premiered on 24 June 1985 and ended on 21  February 1986, replacing Corpo a Corpo and was replaced by Selva de Pedra.

It was created by Dias Gomes based on a play O Berço do Herói (Hero's Cradle) and starred Regina Duarte, Lima Duarte, José Wilker, Lucinha Lins, Yoná Magalhães, Paulo Gracindo, Armando Bógus, Cássia Kis Magro, Elizângela, Fábio Júnior, Lídia Brondi, Cláudio Cavalcanti, Cláudia Raia, Lutero Luiz, Maurício Mattar, Eloísa Mafalda and Ary Fontoura. It was directed by Paul Ubiratan and has co-written by Aguinaldo Silva.

Roque Santeiro became a great success, with high viewership levels, and is recognized today as one of the best telenovelas of all time. It was distributed to several different countries around the world, and had an audience of 60 million viewers (out of approxmimentally 135-138 million Brazilians at the time), and is currently the most-watched show in the history of Brazilian television.

Plot
In the tiny poor town of Asa Branca, in the middle of Brazilian Northeast, Roque Santeiro is worshiped as a saint. He was supposedly killed by a bandit, 18 years ago, trying to save the local church. After his disappearance, local leaderships such as landowner Sinhozinho Malta and mayor Florindo, took profit on that to control the humble population. They even make up a widow, Porcina, who should have married Roque secretly before his death. What they don't expect is that Roque is alive, and he's back to, allegedly, "save his people". Now Malta, Florindo, Porcina, and others must hold him down and explain the "truth" to their commoners, in a desperate attempt to save their own bottoms. Meanwhile, mysterious facts surround Asa Branca, such as a Werewolf, a film crew who are trying to shoot a movie about Roque's story, and violent murderers.

Cast

Impact

Ratings

In its premiere, Roque Santeiro acquired 68.0 Ibope Rating, considering the measurement for Greater São Paulo, eighteen points above the target set by Rede Globo that year. In the same week, on a Saturday, it was registered the lowest audience of the telenovela: 58 points. The average of the first week was 65 points.

On 20 August 1985, in Episode 50, Roque Santeiro posted a record audience: 81 points. It was the first time the telenovela recorded an index above 80 points. In that week, the average was 71 points.

On 17 February 1986, in Episode 205, Roque registered a record audience: 91 points. It was the first time the telenovela recorded an index above 90 points, a fact that would be repeated only in the last chapter: 96 points.

In the last episode, it was registered a historical index on Brazilian television: 100 points. In the scene where Sinhozinho Malta and Viúva Porcina say goodbye to Roque Santeiro, and leave Asa Branca, 100% of the Brazilian television sets were tuned on Rede Globo.

Awards
Troféu APCA (1985):
 Best Telenovela
 Best Actress - Regina Duarte
 Best Actor - Lima Duarte
 Female Revelation - Cláudia Raia
 Best Telenovela Text - Dias Gomes and Aguinaldo Silva

Troféu Imprensa (1985):
 Best Telenovela
 Best Actress - Regina Duarte
 Best Actor - Lima Duarte
 Revelation of the Year - Cláudia Raia (tie with Tetê Espindola)

References

External links 
 

1985 telenovelas
Brazilian telenovelas
TV Globo telenovelas
1985 Brazilian television series debuts
1986 Brazilian television series endings
Brazilian LGBT-related television shows
Gay-related television shows
Portuguese-language telenovelas